WPXN (104.9 FM) is a radio station broadcasting an adult contemporary music format. Licensed to Paxton, Illinois, United States, the station serves the Champaign area. The station is currently owned by Paxton Broadcasting Corporation and features programming from Fox News Radio.

WPXN is the home of local high school sporting events, as well as the Illinois Fighting Illini and NASCAR.

In June 2020 WPXN installed a new broadcasting tower and returned to its full licensed power of 3,000 watts after months of broadcasting at a reduced power 250 watts because of structural issues with the old broadcasting tower.

References

External links

PXN
Mainstream adult contemporary radio stations in the United States
Ford County, Illinois
Champaign County, Illinois
Radio stations established in 1984
1984 establishments in Illinois